Pain Confessor is a Finnish melodic death metal band from Hämeenlinna. It was established in August 2002 and by October 2003 were signed to the Finnish Megamania record label for a three-album deal, a relation that ended in 2008. The band is now signed to Spinefarm Records with whom they released their album Incarcerated.

Besides Finland, and being featured in Tuska Open Air Metal Festival, the band is also popular in Japan after its tour in 2006 together with Amoral, another Finnish metal band.

Music history
The band commenced as a musical entity in 2002, with their first release, Promo 2003, a demo, that was released independently in 2003, They signed to Megamania, where they released a studio album, Turmoil, on September 8, 2004. It was followed up by a second album in 2006, Fearrage.

Members
The band members are:
Markku "Make" Kivistö - vocals
Mikko Kivistö - bass, backing vocals
Aki Kuusinen - drums
Tuomas Kuusinen - guitar
Jaakko Kunnas - guitar
Pasi Laihanen - keyboards

Discography

Albums
2004: Turmoil
2006: Fearrage (FIN #26)
2007: Purgatory of the Second Sun (FIN #15)
2012: Incarcerated (FIN #28)

Singles
2004: "Poor Man's Crown"
2006: "Fall is Evil Days" (FIN #6)
2007: "Ne Plus Ultra" (FIN #1)
Others
2004: "Lake of Regret"

Demos
2003: Promo '03
2008: Demo 2008
2009: Demo 2009

References

External links
Official website
Last.fm

Finnish thrash metal musical groups
Finnish death metal musical groups
Musical groups established in 2002